Verconia verconis is a species of sea slug or dorid nudibranch, a marine gastropod mollusk in the family Chromodorididae.

Distribution
This marine species occurs off South Australia.

Description
The holotype, after being duly presented in the original paper, has been lost or resides in an unknown repository. Until this species is collected again, it must remain an unknown quantity

Ecology

References

 Rudman, W. B. (1984). The Chromodorididae (Opisthobranchia: Mollusca) of the Indo-West Pacific: a review of the genera. Zoological Journal of the Linnean Society. 81(2): 115–273. page(s): 117, 167

Chromodorididae
Gastropods described in 1905